{{DISPLAYTITLE:Rho3 Eridani}}

Rho3 Eridani, Latinized from ρ3 Eridani, is a star located in the constellation Eridanus. It forms an asterism with Rho1 and Rho2 Eridani, south of Cetus, in the upper north east portion of Eridanus. The star has an apparent visual magnitude of 5.26, which is bright enough to be seen with the naked eye on a dark, clear night. The distance to this star, as determined via the parallax method, is about 136 light years.
 
This is an A-type main sequence star with a stellar classification of A5 V. (Some sources list it as A8 V.) It is some 500 million years old and is spinning rapidly with a projected rotational velocity of 186 km/s. This rotation is giving the star a slightly oblate shape, with the equator being 5% larger than the poles. The star has about 120% of the radius of the Sun, and 183% of the Sun's mass. It shines with 10 times the solar luminosity from its outer atmosphere at an effective temperature of 7,400 K.

References

Eridanus, Rho3
Eridanus (constellation)
Eridani, Rho3
Eridani, 10
019107
014293
0925
Durchmusterung objects